Tonga competed at the 2018 Winter Olympics in Pyeongchang, South Korea, from 9 to 25 February 2018. It was represented by a single athlete, cross-country skier Pita Taufatofua. Pita Taufatofua, once again, marched into the Pyeongchang Olympic Stadium shirtless, smothered in coconut oil, and dressed in a traditional ta'ovala (a Tongan mat), after previously doing so in Rio.

Competitors
The following is the list of number of competitors participating in the Tongan delegation per sport.

Cross-country skiing 

Tonga qualified one male athlete, Pita Taufatofua.

Distance

See also
Tonga at the 2016 Summer Olympics
Tonga at the 2018 Commonwealth Games

References

Nations at the 2018 Winter Olympics
2018
2018 in Tongan sport